Magnocoleidae is an extinct family of beetles in the suborder Archostemata. It was first described in 1998 by Hong, who attributes a single genus, Magnocoleus, to this family. The genus contains a single species Magnocoleus huangjiapuensis. The species was extant during the Cretaceous between 130.0 and 125.45 Mya.

References

Archostemata
†
Cretaceous insects of Asia
Prehistoric insect genera